Promoted is a 2015 sex comedy film, directed by Isaac Constein and produced by Daniel and Philip Lief, which spoofs the inner workings of a dysfunctional Los Angeles Advertising Agency. The film was released on August 25, 2015.

Plot
Best friends Alex and Jacob thought that they were on their way to earning LA's most highly celebrated Advertising Account. That is, until the villainous and manipulative Marissa enters the picture, doing everything in her power to win the promotion for herself. Then enter into the equation a gay gangsta rapper, a mentally challenged custodian, a transgender prostitute, a sexually perverted grandfather, and Jacob's demented grandmother.

Cast
 Samm Levine as Jacob Silver
 Aries Spears as HomoThug
 Estelle Harris as Sylvia Silver
 Cody Longo as Alex Francis
 Marty Ingels as Murray Silver
 Joe D'Onofrio as Frankie
 Jennie Kwan as Lu Chang
 Clint Jung as Mr. Chang
 Justine Wachsberger as Marissa Fox
 Luke Ashlocke as Mike
 Mayank Bhatter as Vikram Gupta

Principal photography
The film was set and shot entirely in Los Angeles.

References

External links
 

2015 films
Films shot in Los Angeles
Films set in Los Angeles
2010s sex comedy films
2015 comedy films